CRMO may refer to:

 41xx steel, also known CrMo
 CHOU (AM), a radio station in Quebec
 Chief risk officer (CRO), also known as Chief risk management officer (CRMO)
 Chronic recurrent multifocal osteomyelitis, a rare bone disease